Liaquatpur  is a tehsil located in Rahimyar Khan District, Punjab, Pakistan. Its capital is Liaquatpur. It is administratively subdivided into 25 Union Councils.

References

External links

Rahim Yar Khan District
Tehsils of Punjab, Pakistan